Christian Mora (born 30 December 1997) is an Italian footballer who plays as a defender for  club Siena, on loan from Atalanta.

Club career

Atalanta

Loan to Renate 
On 13 July 2016, Mora was signed by Serie C side Renate on a season-long loan deal. Two weeks later he made his professional debut in Serie C for Renate in a 2–1 home win over Olbia, he was replaced by Alberto Schettino in the 69th minute. On 2 October he played his first entire match for Renate, a 2–0 home win over Prato. Mora ended his season-long loan to Renate with 21 appearances, 11 as a starter and 3 assist, however he played only 2 entire match for the team.

Loan to Piacenza 
On 14 July 2017, Mora was loaned to Serie C club Piacenza on a season-long loan deal. On 30 July he made his debut for Piacenza in a 1–0 home win over Massese in the first round of Coppa Italia, he was replaced by Robero Masullo in the 60th minute. On 27 August he made his Serie C debut for Piacenza as a substitute replacing Edoardo Masciangelo in the 62nd minute of a 2–0 away defeat against Monza. On 1 October, Mora scored his first professional goal, as a substitute, in the 77th minute of a 1–0 away win over Lucchese. On 4 December he played his first entire match for Piacenza, a 3–0 home win over Gavorrano. Mora ended his loan with 25 appearances, 13 as a starter, 1 goal and 2 assists.

Loan to Pro Patria 
On 1 July 2018, Mora was signed by newly Serie C promoted team Aurora Pro Patria on a season-long loan deal for the 2018–19 season. On 16 September he made his debut in Serie C for Pro Patria in a 2–1 home win over Pistoiese, he played the entire match. On 23 December he scored his first goal for Aurora Pro Patria in the 48th minute of a 2–0 away win over Pisa. Mora ended his season-long loan to Aurora Pro Patria with 35 appearances, 1 goal and 4 assists, he also helps the club to reach the play-off, however they lost 2–0 against Carrarese in the first round .

Loan to Cittadella 
After 3 years of loans in Serie C, on 5 July 2019, Mora was loaned to Serie B club Cittadella on a season-long loan deal. On 11 August he made his debut for Cittadella in a 3–0 home win over Padova in the second round of Coppa Italia, he was replaced by Alberto Rizzo after 74 minutes. Twenty days later, on 31 August, he made his Serie B debut for the club in a 4–1 away defeat against Benevento, he played the entire match.

Loan to Alessandria
On 24 September 2020, he joined Serie C club Alessandria on a two-year loan with an option to purchase.

Loan to Siena
After he appeared in one 2021–22 Serie B game for Alessandria, his loan there was terminated and on 25 August 2021 he moved on a two-year loan to Siena.

Career statistics

Club

References

External links 
 

1997 births
Living people
People from Treviglio
Sportspeople from the Province of Bergamo
Footballers from Lombardy
Italian footballers
Association football defenders
Serie B players
Serie C players
Atalanta B.C. players
A.C. Renate players
Piacenza Calcio 1919 players
Aurora Pro Patria 1919 players
A.S. Cittadella players
U.S. Alessandria Calcio 1912 players
A.C.N. Siena 1904 players